Fly Linhas Aéreas was a Brazilian airline which operated between 1995 and 2003.

History

The airline began operations on August 25, 1995, with a Boeing 727-200 as a charter carrier linking Rio de Janeiro and São Paulo to holiday destinations in the northeast of Brazil. Originally it was a direct competitor of Air Vias, another Brazilian airline dedicated to charter flights. Eventually Fly became a carrier with both charter and scheduled low-cost operations.

Though successful in its first years, it suffered a hard economic blow during the 1999 currency exchange devaluation crisis, and a great decrease in traffic, following a world trend, in the second semester of 2001. Those difficulties led to increasing administrative difficulties. The final blow came with increasing competition with Gol Airlines which led to the ceasing of operations in 2003.

Destinations
Fortaleza – Pinto Martins International Airport
Natal – Augusto Severo International Airport
Recife – Guararapes/Gilberto Freyre International Airport
Rio de Janeiro – Galeão/Antonio Carlos Jobim International Airport
São Paulo – Guarulhos/Gov. André Franco Montoro International Airport

Fleet

Airline affinity program
Fly did not have an airline affinity program.

See also
List of defunct airlines of Brazil

References

External links

Fly accidents as per Aviation Safety Database
Timetable image of Fly

Defunct airlines of Brazil
Airlines established in 1995
Airlines disestablished in 2003